Temirzhan Daulet (born 20 February 1991) is a Kazakh Paralympic judoka. He won the silver medal in the men's 73 kg event at the 2020 Summer Paralympics held in Tokyo, Japan.

References 

Living people
1991 births
Kazakhstani male judoka
Paralympic judoka of Kazakhstan
Paralympic silver medalists for Kazakhstan
Paralympic medalists in judo
Judoka at the 2020 Summer Paralympics
Medalists at the 2020 Summer Paralympics
Place of birth missing (living people)
21st-century Kazakhstani people